Gabriela Dabrowski and Jeļena Ostapenko were the defending champions, but chose not to participate together. Dabrowski played alongside Xu Yifan, but lost in the first round to Lara Arruabarrena and Kaitlyn Christian. Ostapenko teamed up with Veronika Kudermetova, but lost in the semifinals to Chan Hao-ching and Latisha Chan.

The Chan sisters went on to win the title, defeating Anna-Lena Grönefeld and Demi Schuurs in the final, 6–1, 3–6, [10–6].

Seeds

Draw

Draw

References

External Links
Main Draw

Qatar Doubles
Qatar Ladies Open
2019 in Qatari sport